Mei Yi (2 January 1913 – 13 September 2003) was a Chinese translator, journalist and politician. In 1938 he translated the English version of How the Steel Was Tempered, which was the earliest Chinese version.

Biography

ROC era
Mei was born Chen Shaoqing in Xiangqiao District of Chaozhou, Guangdong, on January 2, 1913, to Chen Yansheng, a boatman. He primarily studied at Chengnan Primary School and secondary studied at Shantou Jinshan Middle School. In the summer of 1932, Mei went to Peiping alone, looking for revolutionary organizations and studying English by himself in the Beijing Library. He started to publish works in 1934. At the beginning of 1935, Mei joined the Chinese League of Left-Wing Writers and went to Shanghai in the autumn of the same year to teach at a private high school, but he was expelled from the school soon because he let the students in his class take part in the demonstration. Mei joined the Communist Party of China in 1937. After Shanghai was occupied by the Imperial Japanese Army, he served as editor-in-chief of the Daily Translation. In September 1940 he was accepted to Hangchow University. From 1942 to 1945, he served in the Propaganda Department of the East China Bureau of the Communist Party of China. From 1945 to 1946, he served as Secretary of the Shanghai Cultural Committee of the Communist Party of China and spokesman of the delegation of the Communist Party of China in Nanjing in 1946. From 1947 to 1949, he served as deputy editor-in-chief of Yan'an and Taihang Branch Office of the Xinhua News Agency.

PRC era
After the establishment of the Communist State in 1949, he became deputy director-general and then director-general and secretary of the Party Group of the Central Broadcasting Bureau. In 1957, he was elected vice-president of the All-China Journalists Association.

In 1966, Mao Zedong launched the Cultural Revolution, he was brought to be persecuted and then was sent to the May Seventh Cadre Schools to do farm works in Suiyang District of Shangqiu, Henan.

Since 1978, he had been secretary-general, vice-president and first secretary of the Party Group of the Chinese Academy of Social Sciences, and vice-director of the Editorial Committee of Encyclopedia of China. From 1986 to 1996 he served as chief editor of China Encyclopedia Publishing House.

He was a member of the 1st and 5th National Committee of the Chinese People's Political Consultative Conference. He was a delegate to the 1st, 2nd and 3rd National People's Congress. He was a member of the 1st and 2nd Advisory Committee of the Central Committee of the Communist Party of China.

He died on September 13, 2003 in Beijing, aged 90.

Personal life
Mei married Yin Qihua.

Works

Translation
 How the Steel Was Tempered

References

1913 births
2003 deaths
Politicians from Chaozhou
Hangchow University alumni
Writers from Chaozhou
People's Republic of China politicians from Guangdong
Chinese Communist Party politicians from Guangdong
English–Chinese translators
People's Republic of China translators
People of the Republic of China
20th-century Chinese translators
21st-century Chinese translators